Andrés de la Rosa Anaya (born 8 May 1971) is a Mexican politician affiliated with the PAN. He served as Federal Deputy of the LXII Legislature of the Mexican Congress representing Baja California. He subsequently served as a local deputy in the XXII Legislature of the Congress of Baja California.

References

1971 births
Living people
Members of the Congress of Baja California
National Action Party (Mexico) politicians
21st-century Mexican politicians
Autonomous University of Baja California alumni
Politicians from Baja California
People from Mexicali Municipality
Members of the Chamber of Deputies (Mexico) for Baja California